Ashley Battle (born May 31, 1982), is a professional basketball player. Drafted by the Seattle Storm in 2005, she played 2 games for them before being waived. She was with the New York Liberty for the 2006 through 2009 seasons. Battle played collegiately for the University of Connecticut women's basketball team.

Early life
Ashley is an only child to a single mother.  She started playing basketball at an early age with her cousins.  When she was in fifth grade at Manchester Elementary School in Pittsburgh, Pennsylvania, she was the only girl on the boys' basketball team. While playing in a school tournament, a few Amateur Athletic Union coaches saw Ashley, and were soon recruiting her to play for them.  During the AAU tournaments, Ashley met and became friends with Maria Conlon and Diana Taurasi.

High school
During her high school years she was looking to get away from the dangerous Pittsburgh gangs, so she decided to attend The Linsly School, a boarding school in Wheeling, West Virginia that was strong academically.  Linsly was known for academics and not basketball.  Ashley helped change that.  In her junior season the team went undefeated.  Ashley set school records in points, rebounds, assists, steals, and set the trend with more good female basketball players coming to the school to play. Battle was named a WBCA All-American. She participated in the 2000 WBCA High School All-America Game, where she scored three points.

USA Basketball
Battle was a member of the USA Women's U18 team which won the gold medal at the FIBA Americas Championship in Mar Del Plata, Argentina. The event was held in July 2000, when the USA team defeated Cuba to win the championship. Battle helped the team win all five games, scoring 5.4 points per game.

College
Ashley's number 1 choice for college was Stanford University.  Stanford wanted Ashley to come for her visit in the spring of her senior year in high school.  Ashley wanted to make a decision and sign her commitment letter during the early signing period in the fall of her senior year so that meant Stanford was not an option.  She narrowed her choices to Duke University, Pennsylvania State University, University of Connecticut.  Ashley's mom really liked Duke – basketball was on the rise, the education was great, and it was driving distance from Pittsburgh.  Ashley was having a tough time making the decision between UConn and Duke.  Her AAU friends Maria Conlon and Diana Taurasi had already committed to UConn so she decided to follow them there.  Ashley's freshman year at UConn started out great. She consistently got playing time until she was injured her elbow in a game against Miami.  Since it was only the fifth game of the season she was granted a red-shirt.  In 2002 the Huskies went undefeated and won the National Championship.  They would go on to also win the 2003 and 2004 Championships.  During the 2003 season Ashley earned Big East Defensive Player of the Year award.  She graduated from UConn with a bachelor's degree in Marketing and Economics.

Professional career

WNBA
Battle was selected by the Seattle Storm at No. 25 in the 2005 WNBA Draft, but played in only two games that year.  After the 2005 season, she was signed by the New York Liberty.  In 2006, Battle played in thirty-three games and developed a reputation as a key defensive weapon for the Liberty.  In 2007, she played in thirty-four regular-season games, averaging 22 minutes per game, 7.4 points per game, 3.7 rebounds per game, and 1.0 steals per game.

International
During the 2006 WNBA off-season, Battle played for the Spanish professional basketball team Universitario de Ferrol. Next two campaigns she played in Gran Canaria y Leon, and now she is playing with Asefa Estudiantes.

UConn statistics

Huskies of Honor induction

On December 29, 2013, the University of Connecticut inducted two women's basketball team, the National Championship winning teams of 2002–03 and 2003–04 into the Huskies of Honor. Battle was a player for each of those two seasons.

See also
 Connecticut Huskies women's basketball
 List of Connecticut women's basketball players with 1000 points
 2003–04 Connecticut Huskies women's basketball team

She is now a first year head coach for the Chartiers Valley High School Girls' Basketball team of Pittsburgh, PA. Her assistant coaches are Julius Page who played at Pitt but couldn't enter the NBA draft due to an injury and Joe D'Abruzzo.

Notes

1982 births
Living people
American women's basketball players
Basketball players from Pittsburgh
Linsly School alumni
New York Liberty players
San Antonio Stars players
Seattle Storm draft picks
Seattle Storm players
UConn Huskies women's basketball players
Forwards (basketball)